Events from the year 1375 in Ireland.

Incumbent
 Lord: Edward III

Events
 Art Óg mac Murchadha Caomhánach becomes King of Leinster.

Births

Deaths
 Mael Sechlainn Ó Domhnalláin, an Irish poet.

References